The lieutenant governor of Delaware is the second ranking executive officer of the U.S. state of Delaware. Lieutenant governors are elected for a term of four years in the same general election as the U.S. president and take office the following January.

As in many other U.S. state legislatures, the lieutenant governor also serves as the President of the Delaware Senate, though they can only issue a vote if there is a tie on any vote.

The Office of Lieutenant Governor was created by the Delaware Constitution of 1897, and the first election took place in 1900.

Although in practice the candidate for lieutenant governor is nominated as a ticket with the candidate for governor, the offices of governor and lieutenant governor are voted on separately in Delaware.  In 1972, 1976, and 1984, the governor and lieutenant governor were elected from different parties.

Bethany Hall-Long is the current lieutenant governor, having taken office January 17, 2017.

The offices of the lieutenant governor are at the state capital of Dover.

List 

 Parties

 

!bgcolor=#CCCCCC | 
!bgcolor=#CCCCCC |Image
!bgcolor=#CCCCCC |Lt. Governor
!bgcolor=#CCCCCC |Took office
!bgcolor=#CCCCCC |Left office
!bgcolor=#CCCCCC |Governor(s) served under
!bgcolor=#CCCCCC |Party 
|-
|bgcolor=#FFE8E8 |1
|bgcolor=#FFE8E8 |
|bgcolor=#FFE8E8 |Philip L. Cannon
|bgcolor=#FFE8E8 |January 15, 1901
|bgcolor=#FFE8E8 |January 17, 1905
|bgcolor=#FFE8E8 |John Hunn
|bgcolor=#FFE8E8 |Republican
|-
|bgcolor=#FFE8E8 |2
|bgcolor=#FFE8E8 |
|bgcolor=#FFE8E8 |Isaac T. Parker
|bgcolor=#FFE8E8 |January 17, 1905
|bgcolor=#FFE8E8 |January 19, 1909
|bgcolor=#FFE8E8 |Preston Lea
|bgcolor=#FFE8E8 |Republican
|-
|bgcolor=#FFE8E8 |3
|bgcolor=#FFE8E8 |
|bgcolor=#FFE8E8 |John M. Mendinhall
|bgcolor=#FFE8E8 |January 19, 1909
|bgcolor=#FFE8E8 |January 21, 1913
|bgcolor=#FFE8E8 |Simeon S. Pennewill
|bgcolor=#FFE8E8 |Republican
|-
|bgcolor=#DDEEFF |4
|bgcolor=#DDEEFF |
|bgcolor=#DDEEFF |Colen Ferguson
|bgcolor=#DDEEFF |January 21, 1913
|bgcolor=#DDEEFF |January 16, 1917
|bgcolor=#DDEEFF |Charles R. Miller (Republican) 
|bgcolor=#DDEEFF |Democratic
|-
|bgcolor=#DDEEFF |5
|bgcolor=#DDEEFF |
|bgcolor=#DDEEFF |Lewis E. Eliason
|bgcolor=#DDEEFF |January 16, 1917
|bgcolor=#DDEEFF |May 2, 1919
|bgcolor=#DDEEFF |John G. Townsend, Jr. (Republican)
|bgcolor=#DDEEFF |Democratic
|-
|bgcolor=#FFE8E8 |6
|bgcolor=#FFE8E8 |
|bgcolor=#FFE8E8 |J. Danforth Bush
|bgcolor=#FFE8E8 |January 18, 1921
|bgcolor=#FFE8E8 |January 20, 1925
|bgcolor=#FFE8E8 |William D. Denney
|bgcolor=#FFE8E8 |Republican
|-
|bgcolor=#FFE8E8 |7
|bgcolor=#FFE8E8 |
|bgcolor=#FFE8E8 |James H. Anderson
|bgcolor=#FFE8E8 |January 20, 1925
|bgcolor=#FFE8E8 |January 15, 1929
|bgcolor=#FFE8E8 |Robert P. Robinson
|bgcolor=#FFE8E8 |Republican
|-
|bgcolor=#FFE8E8 |8
|bgcolor=#FFE8E8 |
|bgcolor=#FFE8E8 |James H. Hazel
|bgcolor=#FFE8E8 |January 15, 1929
|bgcolor=#FFE8E8 |January 17, 1933
|bgcolor=#FFE8E8 |C. Douglass Buck
|bgcolor=#FFE8E8 |Republican
|-
|bgcolor=#FFE8E8 |9
|bgcolor=#FFE8E8 |
|bgcolor=#FFE8E8 |Roy F. Corley
|bgcolor=#FFE8E8 |January 17, 1933
|bgcolor=#FFE8E8 |January 19, 1937
|bgcolor=#FFE8E8 |C. Douglass Buck
|bgcolor=#FFE8E8 |Republican
|-
|bgcolor=#DDEEFF |10
|bgcolor=#DDEEFF |
|bgcolor=#DDEEFF |Edward W. Cooch
|bgcolor=#DDEEFF |January 19, 1937
|bgcolor=#DDEEFF |January 21, 1941
|bgcolor=#DDEEFF |Richard C. McMullen
|bgcolor=#DDEEFF |Democratic
|-
|bgcolor=#DDEEFF |11
|bgcolor=#DDEEFF |
|bgcolor=#DDEEFF |Isaac J. MacCollum
|bgcolor=#DDEEFF |January 21, 1941
|bgcolor=#DDEEFF |January 16, 1945
|bgcolor=#DDEEFF |Walter W. Bacon
|bgcolor=#DDEEFF |Democratic
|-
|bgcolor=#DDEEFF |12
|bgcolor=#DDEEFF |
|bgcolor=#DDEEFF |Elbert N. Carvel
|bgcolor=#DDEEFF |January 16, 1945
|bgcolor=#DDEEFF |January 18, 1949
|bgcolor=#DDEEFF |Walter W. Bacon
|bgcolor=#DDEEFF |Democratic
|-
|bgcolor=#DDEEFF |13
|bgcolor=#DDEEFF |
|bgcolor=#DDEEFF |Alexis I. du Pont Bayard
|bgcolor=#DDEEFF |January 18, 1949
|bgcolor=#DDEEFF |January 20, 1953
|bgcolor=#DDEEFF |Elbert N. Carvel
|bgcolor=#DDEEFF |Democratic
|-
|bgcolor=#FFE8E8 |14
|bgcolor=#FFE8E8 |
|bgcolor=#FFE8E8 |John W. Rollins
|bgcolor=#FFE8E8 |January 20, 1953
|bgcolor=#FFE8E8 |January 15, 1957
|bgcolor=#FFE8E8 |J. Caleb Boggs
|bgcolor=#FFE8E8 |Republican
|-
|bgcolor=#FFE8E8 |15
|bgcolor=#FFE8E8 |
|bgcolor=#FFE8E8 |David P. Buckson
|bgcolor=#FFE8E8 |January 15, 1957
|bgcolor=#FFE8E8 |December 30, 1960
|bgcolor=#FFE8E8 |J. Caleb Boggs
|bgcolor=#FFE8E8 |Republican
|-
|bgcolor=#DDEEFF |16
|bgcolor=#DDEEFF |
|bgcolor=#DDEEFF |Eugene Lammot
|bgcolor=#DDEEFF |January 17, 1961
|bgcolor=#DDEEFF |January 19, 1965
|bgcolor=#DDEEFF |Elbert N. Carvel
|bgcolor=#DDEEFF |Democratic
|-
|bgcolor=#DDEEFF |17
|bgcolor=#DDEEFF |
|bgcolor=#DDEEFF |Sherman W. Tribbitt
|bgcolor=#DDEEFF |January 19, 1965
|bgcolor=#DDEEFF |January 21, 1969
|bgcolor=#DDEEFF |Charles L. Terry, Jr.
|bgcolor=#DDEEFF |Democratic
|-
|bgcolor=#FFE8E8 |18
|bgcolor=#FFE8E8 |
|bgcolor=#FFE8E8 |Eugene Bookhammer
|bgcolor=#FFE8E8 |January 21, 1969
|bgcolor=#FFE8E8 |January 18, 1977
|bgcolor=#FFE8E8 |Russell W. Peterson (Republican)Sherman W. Tribbitt (Democratic)
|bgcolor=#FFE8E8 |Republican
|-
|bgcolor=#DDEEFF |19
|bgcolor=#DDEEFF |
|bgcolor=#DDEEFF |James D. McGinnis
|bgcolor=#DDEEFF |January 18, 1977
|bgcolor=#DDEEFF |January 20, 1981
|bgcolor=#DDEEFF |Pete du Pont (Republican)
|bgcolor=#DDEEFF |Democratic
|-
|bgcolor=#FFE8E8 |20
|bgcolor=#FFE8E8 |
|bgcolor=#FFE8E8 |Mike Castle
|bgcolor=#FFE8E8 |January 20, 1981
|bgcolor=#FFE8E8 |January 15, 1985
|bgcolor=#FFE8E8 |Pete du Pont
|bgcolor=#FFE8E8 |Republican
|-
|bgcolor=#DDEEFF |21
|bgcolor=#DDEEFF |
|bgcolor=#DDEEFF |S. B. Woo
|bgcolor=#DDEEFF |January 15, 1985
|bgcolor=#DDEEFF |January 20, 1989
|bgcolor=#DDEEFF |Michael N. Castle
|bgcolor=#DDEEFF |Democratic
|-
|bgcolor=#FFE8E8 |22
|bgcolor=#FFE8E8 |
|bgcolor=#FFE8E8 |Dale E. Wolf
|bgcolor=#FFE8E8 |January 20, 1989
|bgcolor=#FFE8E8 |December 31, 1992
|bgcolor=#FFE8E8 |Mike Castle
|bgcolor=#FFE8E8 |Republican
|-
|bgcolor=#DDEEFF |23
|bgcolor=#DDEEFF |
|bgcolor=#DDEEFF |Ruth Ann Minner
|bgcolor=#DDEEFF |January 19, 1993
|bgcolor=#DDEEFF |January 3, 2001
|bgcolor=#DDEEFF |Tom Carper
|bgcolor=#DDEEFF |Democratic
|-
|bgcolor=#DDEEFF |24
|bgcolor=#DDEEFF |
|bgcolor=#DDEEFF |John Carney
|bgcolor=#DDEEFF |January 16, 2001
|bgcolor=#DDEEFF |January 20, 2009
|bgcolor=#DDEEFF |Ruth Ann Minner
|bgcolor=#DDEEFF |Democratic
|-
|bgcolor=#DDEEFF |25
|bgcolor=#DDEEFF |
|bgcolor=#DDEEFF |Matthew Denn
|bgcolor=#DDEEFF |January 20, 2009
|bgcolor=#DDEEFF |January 6, 2015
|bgcolor=#DDEEFF |Jack Markell
|bgcolor=#DDEEFF |Democratic
|-
|bgcolor=#DDEEFF |26
|bgcolor=#DDEEFF |
|bgcolor=#DDEEFF |Bethany Hall-Long
|bgcolor=#DDEEFF |January 17, 2017
|bgcolor=#DDEEFF |present
|bgcolor=#DDEEFF |John Carney
|bgcolor=#DDEEFF |Democratic

References

 
 
 Pickett, Russell S. (2006). Delaware and U.S.History. Retrieved January 1, 2006.
 Kestenbaum, Lawrence (2006). The Political Graveyard. Retrieved January 1, 2006.